University over the Abyss is a book about the educational and cultural life in the Terezín (German: Theresienstadt) ghetto.  Authors Elena Makarova, Sergei Makarov and Viktor Kuperman have searched available archives, interviewed survivors worldwide and compiled the definitive summary of this nominally illegal but extensive phenomenon that included formal lectures, poetry readings, concerts, storytelling sessions and theatrical and opera performances, all in a setting that was a holding place for prisoners who were ultimately on their way to the Auschwitz-Birkenau extermination camp.

This English-language book is published by Verba Publishers in Jerusalem and is now in its second edition.  In addition, the book has been published in Czech and in Russian.

References
 Adler, H.G. Theresienstadt, 1941-1945; Der Antlitz einer Zwangsgemeinschaft. Geschichte, Soziologie, Psychologie. Tübingen, Mohr, 1960.
 
 Feuss, Axel. Das Theresienstadt-Konvolut, Hamburg 2002, 
 
 
 Klíma, Ivan. "A Childhood in Terezin", Granta 44 (1993).
 
 Milotova, Jaroslava and Anna Hajkova, eds. Theresienstädter Studien und Dokumente, 1994–present (yearbook), online at the CEEOL database. 
 
 
 
 Schiff, Vera. Theresienstadt: the Town the Nazis Gave to the Jews, 
 Sebald, W.G. Austerlitz.
 Volavkova, Hana, ed. ...I never saw another butterfly...:Children's Drawings and Poems from Terezin Concentration Camp 1942-1944, Schocken Books, 1993.

External links

 University over the Abyss website 
 Terezín Initiative Institute
 The Archive of Holocaust at The Jewish Museum in Prague
 List of Lecturers in Ghetto Theresienstadt 

Theresienstadt Ghetto
History books about the Holocaust